The Hellenic Futsal Cup is the second important competition of futsal in Greece. It started in 2000-2001 season and the first winner was A.C. Doukas. The most successful club so far is Athens 90 which has won 7 cups. The last winner is AEK  that defeated Olympiada with 1-0 score in the recent final.

The finals

Performance by club

Super Cup

References

Futsal in Greece
Futsal competitions in Greece